Magathala Nattu Mary is a 1957 Indian Tamil-language film directed by S. S. Rajan. The film stars Sriram and Kumari Thangam.

Cast
List adapted from the database of Film News Anandan and from Thiraikalanjiyam.

Male cast
Sriram
P. S. Veerappa
Raghuveer
E. R. Sahadevan
Mohan
P. Varatharajan
T. C. Sundaramoorthy

Female cast
Kumari Thangam
G. Sakunthala
Susheela
Revathy

Production
The film was produced by M. L. Pathy under the banner Jaikumar Pictures and was directed by S. S. Rajan. Sam D. Dasan wrote the screenplay and dialogues. Cinematography was handled by Sanganlal and Raj was in charge of art direction. The film was made at the Paramount Studios in Chennai.

Soundtrack
Music was composed by R. Parthasarathy while the lyrics were penned by Naavarasu, M. P. Sivam and Kambadasan. Playback singers are P. B. Srinivas, S. V. Ponnusamy, Ghantasala, P. Susheela, Jikki, K. Rani, S. Janaki, Soolamangalam Rajalakshmi and K. Jamuna Rani.

The song Kannukku Naerae Minnidum Thaarai is the first Tamil duet by P. B. Srinivas and S. Janaki.

References

1950s Tamil-language films